Outloud may refer to:

Outloud, a band founded by Nile Rodgers, or their 1987 eponymous album
OutLoud!, a 2008 album by Spensha Baker

See also
Out Loud (disambiguation)